The 2016 Pirelli World Challenge was the 27th running of the Sports Car Club of America's World Challenge series. Johnny O'Connell was the defending champion in the highest class, the GT class.

Schedule

The final calendar was revealed on November 3, 2015. The season comprised 11 rounds, with several rounds in support of the IndyCar Series and the WeatherTech SportsCar Championship. All tracks from the previous season were returning except for the Belle Isle, which was replaced by Lime Rock Park. On May 4, 2016, WC Vision announced that the TC class races at Mid-Ohio would be replaced by races at Lime Rock Park to give the drivers more track time.

Notes

Entry list

GT/GTA

Notes

GT Cup

Every driver participated in a Porsche 911 GT3 Cup.

GTS

Notes

TC/TCA/TCB

Race results

Notes

Championship standings

Drivers' championships
Points were awarded based on finishing positions as shown in the chart below. The driver had to complete at least 50% of the class winner's number of laps to receive points. The Pole position winner of every class received 7 points with the exception of the GTA class.

GT

Notes
1 – Andrew Palmer set the fastest lap in Race 1 and would therefore inherit pole position for Race 2 and the seven points that comes with it. Palmer was involved in a horrific accident together with Jorge De La Torre in the warm-up session prior to Race 2. Álvaro Parente set the second fastest lap in Race 1 and since Palmer did not start the race he took pole position for Race 2 and was awarded seven points that comes with it. This was corrected prior to the season finale at Laguna Seca following a points audit by SCCA and WC Vision.
Results denoted by † did not complete sufficient laps in order to score points.

GTA

Notes
Results denoted by † did not complete sufficient laps in order to score points.

GT Cup
Every driver competes in a Porsche 911 GT3 Cup.

Notes
Results denoted by † did not complete sufficient laps in order to score points.

GTS

Notes
Results denoted by † did not complete sufficient laps in order to score points.

TC
Drivers that were not able to attend the Lime Rock round of the championship, but competed in all other rounds of the full season, received double points in both races at Laguna Seca. Drivers that participated in the entire 2016 season and entered Lime Rock Park, were able to choose the better of one of the Lime Rock driver points results, or one of their Laguna Seca driver points results, and be given double points for just that round. The driver may drop driver points from one of the other weakest three races from Lime Rock or Laguna Seca only. Points for Pole position for these two rounds are included in the calculation. This applies only to driver points.
Results dropped are denoted by parentheses. Results with double points are denoted by x2.

Notes
Results denoted by † did not complete sufficient laps in order to score points.

TCA
The rules about points received at Lime Rock and Laguna Seca applying to the TC class, applies to the TCA class too.

Notes
Results denoted by † did not complete sufficient laps in order to score points.

TCB
The rules about points received at Lime Rock and Laguna Seca applying to the TC class, applies to the TCB class too.

Notes
Results denoted by † did not complete sufficient laps in order to score points.
1 – Henry Morse was put in last place of the TCB class per TR.9 GCR9.1.10 after Race 1 at Laguna Seca.

Manufacturers' championships
Only those manufacturers who are SCCA Pro Racing corporate members were eligible to receive points toward the Manufacturers' Championship. Points were awarded based on finishing positions as shown in the chart below. Only the highest finishing car of each eligible manufacturer earned points for its finishing position.

GT

Notes
Results denoted by † did not complete sufficient laps in order to score points.

GTS

Notes
Results denoted by † did not complete sufficient laps in order to score points.

TC

Notes
Results denoted by † did not complete sufficient laps in order to score points.

TCA

Notes
Results denoted by † did not complete sufficient laps in order to score points.

References

GT World Challenge America
Pirelli World Challenge